"Chase the Tear" is a single released by the band Portishead on 10 December 2009, as a download-only for Human Rights Day to raise money for Amnesty International UK. It reached number 164 in the UK charts, and was later released as a limited edition 12" vinyl single on 14 November 2011, again for Amnesty UK.

References

External links
Official site

2009 singles
Portishead (band) songs
2009 songs
Charity singles
Songs written by Adrian Utley
Songs written by Beth Gibbons
Songs written by Geoff Barrow